Lee's Family Reunion is a Taiwanese Hokkien television series that airs on Sanlih E-Television in Taiwan. The producers received funding from the Government Information Office to produce this series in high definition.

Cast

Main

Soundtrack

片頭曲
惦在你身邊（2013年10月31日−2013年10月31日）
主唱：黃乙玲，作詞：彭立，作曲：彭立
永遠再會（2013年11月1日−2013年11月29日）
主唱：邵大倫，作詞：許明傑，作曲：許明傑
望天草（2013年12月2日−2013年12月31日）
主唱：張秀卿，作詞：張燕清，作曲：張燕清
說得到做不到（2014年1月1日−2014年1月31日）
主唱：甲子慧，作詞：郭之儀，作曲：郭之儀
雨傘代表阮心肝（2014年2月3日−2014年2月18日）
主唱：李翊君，作詞：高以德，作曲：黃明洲
無聲（2014年2月19日−2014年2月28日）
主唱：李翊君，作詞：吳梵，作曲：吳梵
阿郎行船曲（2014年3月3日−2014年3月31日）
主唱：楊哲，詞曲：竹間也
阿母（2014年4月1日−2014年4月30日）
主唱：沈建豪，詞曲：陳偉強
爸爸請你也保重（2014年5月1日−2014年5月30日）
主唱：Chris Hung，作詞：董家銘，作曲：高樂榮
愛著妳（2014年6月2日−2014年6月30日）
主唱：吳俊宏、向蕙玲，作詞：石國人，作曲：石國人
請你相信我的愛（2014年7月1日−2014年7月31日）
主唱：林國慶、董育君，作詞：林國慶，作曲：林國慶
心頭石（2014年8月1日−2014年8月29日）
主唱：邱芸子，作詞：高以德，作曲：林文德
為愛相逢（2014年9月1日−2014年9月30日）
主唱：林良歡、翁立友，作詞：石國人，作曲：石國人
兄弟（2014年10月1日−2014年10月31日）
主唱：陳茂豐，作詞：李友雄，作曲：李友雄
青春的夢（2014年11月3日−2014年11月28日）
主唱：秀蘭瑪雅，作詞：鄭喬安，作曲：鄭喬安
阮的幸福（2014年12月1日−2014年12月31日）
主唱：陳淑萍，作詞：石國人，作曲：石國人
手中花（2015年1月1日−2015年1月30日）
主唱：孫淑媚，作詞：球球，作曲：孫淑媚
英雄好漢（2015年2月2日−2015年2月27日）
主唱：余天龍、陳四皆，作詞：余天龍，作曲：余天龍
思念的夢（2015年3月2日−2015年3月31日）
主唱：喬幼，作詞：石國人，作曲：石國人
癡情過重（2015年4月1日−2015年4月30日）
主唱：甲子慧，作詞：林東松，作曲：林東松
真情夢（2015年5月1日−2015年5月29日）
主唱：洪榮宏，作詞：何賀田，作曲：何賀田
八字命（2015年6月1日−2015年6月30日）
主唱：莊振凱，作詞：石國人，作曲：石國人
望月話相思（2015年7月1日−2015年7月3日）
主唱：鄭君威、王秀琪，作詞：張明達，作曲：小葉
三生緣（2015年7月6日−2015年7月27日）
主唱：方瑞娥，作詞：志峰，作曲：志峰
唯一的愛（2015年7月28日-2015年7月31日）
主唱：Tsai Hsiao-hu、董育君，作詞：張錦華，作曲：張錦華
你是我的玫瑰（2015年8月3日-2015年8月31日）
主唱：葉諾帆，作詞：林文德，作曲：林文德
紅豆（2015年9月1日-2015年9月30日）
主唱：謝宜君，作詞：石國人，作曲：石國人
我有情你有意（2015年10月1日-2015年10月30日）
主唱：吳木、尤姿涵，作詞：李岩修，作曲：徐嘉良
愛越深心越寒（2015年11月2日-2015年11月30日）
主唱：謝莉婷，作詞：蔡宜汝，作曲：蔡宜汝
甲妳惜命命（2015年12月1日-2015年12月31日）
主唱：翁立友、謝金晶，作詞：石國人，作曲：石國人
團圓（2016年1月1日-2016年1月29日）
主唱：孫淑媚，作詞：鄭丞杰，作曲：鄭丞杰
相思話（2016年2月1日-2016年2月29日）
主唱：陳淑萍，作詞：王宗凱、張蕙貞，作曲：王宗凱
夢你夢到醒（2016年3月1日-2016年3月2日）
主唱：洪榮宏，作詞：陳宏銘，作曲：陳宏銘
愛你到永遠（2016年3月3日-2016年3月31日）
主唱：洪榮宏，作詞：許明傑，作曲：田中郎
夢中的蝴蝶（2016年4月1日-2016年4月29日）
主唱：江志豐、吳申梅，作詞：江志豐，作曲：江志豐
一夜香（2016年5月2日-2016年5月31日）
主唱：徐紫淇，作詞：張燕清，作曲：張燕清
孤鸞命（2016年6月1日-2016年6月30日）
主唱：陳百潭、鳳娘，作詞：陳百潭，作曲：陳百潭
感謝有你（2016年7月1日-2016年7月29日）
主唱：謝莉婷，作詞：高以德，作曲：陳文靛
手中戲（2016年8月1日-2016年8月3日）
主唱：莊振凱，作詞：張道寬、王宗凱，作曲：王宗凱

International broadcast

Malaysia broadcast
The drama was broadcast on 8TV in original Hokkien language under the English title Lee's Family Reunion from Monday to Friday, at 18:00 MST starting 2012.

Singapore broadcast
Due to local broadcast laws prohibiting radio or television broadcasts in Chinese dialects, the show was dubbed into Mandarin when it aired on Singapore's MediaCorp Channel 8, thus making it the first channel to broadcast the show in Mandarin. The show is currently aired on Mediacorp Channel 8 on Saturdays from 7 to 9:00 pm and from 7 to 10:00 pm on Sundays with English and Chinese subtitles and ended its run on 19 May 2018.

Repeat Telecast (2019)
The drama Night Market Life ended its repeat telecast on 11 September 2019. It succeeded the 10.30 am – 12.30 pm timeslot from Monday to Thursday (Except on Fridays due to The Butterfly Chalice at 10.30pm and E Getai at 11.30pm) on Mediacorp Channel 8 with Chinese subtitles and it ended its repeat telecast on 8 June 2021 which Spring Flower succeeded the 10.30am to 12.30pm time slot.

References

Hokkien-language television shows
Taiwanese drama television series
2010 Taiwanese television series debuts
2011 Taiwanese television series endings
Sanlih E-Television original programming